Mutilation Mile is a 2009 American horror film shot, edited, written, produced, and directed by Ron Atkins. The film stars Lawrence Bucher and Daniel McCabe as Jack and Jimmy DeGrasso, who, on a mission to find the killer of their beloved uncle Sal, murder everyone who crosses their path.

The word "fuck" is used 664 times in the film's 82-minute running time, making it the third films that most frequently uses the word.

Cast

Release
The film received positive reviews from horror critics. Film Threat gave it three-and-a-half stars out of a possible four.

Horrornews.net notes that "MM fits nicely into a category of extreme crime and extreme violence like a welcoming cousin. Probably more attuned to sit closer to on-your-shelf films like A Serbian Film, Kalifornia, and I Stand Alone than say Saw or Hostel. The film doesn't need subtitles, but it might be a recommended option for viewers who feel weird about 90 minutes of intense screaming bellowing out and disturbing your neighbors."

References

External links
 
 

2009 films
2009 horror films
2000s crime films
2000s thriller films
American horror thriller films
American independent films
2000s English-language films
2000s American films